Jacob Brønnum Scavenius (2 April 1749 – 20 June 1820) was a Danish landowner.

Early life and career
Scavenius was born in Skagen in 1749 as the 9th of 11 children of merchant Peder Christensen Brønnum (or Brøndum) and Anne Ibsdatter. He graduated from Aalborg Grammar School in 1770 and assumed the name Scavenius (a latinification of for Skagbo = person from Skagen).

He returned to Denmark as a wealthy man in 1792 after spending 15 years in Bengal.

Property and titles
Scavenius purchased the Gjorslev, Erikstrup and Søholm on Stevns from the Lindencrone family in 1793. In 1798 he also purchased Klintholm on the island of Møn. He made a turn-around on Hjorslev and established a chalk plant at Bøgeskov.

He was appointed to justitsråd in 1793 and etatsråd in 1711. He was interested in mathematics and literature. He created a large collection of books but much of it was lost in the fire of Christiansborg Palace in 1794 as well as in a fire caused by the British bombardement of Copenhagen in 1807.

Personal life
 
He married Karine Lucie Debes (1775-1825) in 1794. She was a daughter of Supreme Court justice  Lucas Debes and Christine née Suhr. Two sons died young. The daughter Jacobine married headmaster at Sorø Academy Hector Estrup and became the mother of later prime minister J.B.S. Estrup.

Scavenius died at Gjorslev on  20 June 1820 and is buried at Gortug Cemetery.

References

18th-century Danish businesspeople
19th-century Danish businesspeople
18th-century Danish landowners
19th-century Danish landowners
People from Skagen
Scavenius family
1749 births
1820 deaths